The Billboard Top Latin albums chart, published in Billboard magazine, is a record chart that features Latin music sales information. This data are compiled by Nielsen SoundScan from a sample that includes music stores, music departments at electronics and department stores, Internet sales (both physical and digital) and verifiable sales from concert venues in the United States.

There were nine number-one albums in 2005, including Barrio Fino by Daddy Yankee, which peaked at the top of the chart for 25 weeks, sold nearly 900,000 copies in the United States, reached number 26 on Billboard 200, was named Reggaeton Album of the Year at the 2005 Billboard Latin Music Awards, and won a Latin Grammy Award for Best Urban Music Album. Another recording by Daddy Yankee entitled Barrio Fino en Directo was released on December 7, 2005 and reached the first spot on the chart. The album contains live tracks and five new songs, including the Hot Latin Tracks number-one single "Rompe". RBD, Don Omar, K-Paz de la Sierra, Grupo Montéz de Durango and Wisin & Yandel peaked at number one for the first time in their careers. Cautivo, the 12th studio album by Puerto Rican performer Chayanne became his third number-one set on this list.

Fijación Oral Vol. 1 by Colombian singer-songwriter Shakira spent 17 weeks at number one on the chart. Despite a ban by retail chain Ritmo Latino, the album had the largest sales week for a Spanish-language album since Nielsen SoundScan began tracking in 1991, with 157,000 copies sold, which led to a first-ever debut by a Latin album at number four on Billboard 200, surpassing Ricky Martin's Almas del Silencio, which was the previous record holder with 65,000 units in 2003. This album won five Latin Grammy Awards, including Album of the Year, and also received the Grammy Award for Best Latin Rock/Alternative Album.

Albums

References

2005 Latin
United States Latin Albums
2005 in Latin music